"All Nightmare Long" is a song by American heavy metal band Metallica, released as the second single from their album Death Magnetic. The single was released on December 15, 2008. The song is in drop D tuning. It was nominated for the Kerrang! Award for Best Single.

Music video
The music video, directed by Roboshobo (Robert Schober), debuted on December 7, 2008, on Metallica's official website and Yahoo! Video. The video, which does not feature the band, is an alternate history narrative done in grainy mockumentary style, depicting a sequence of fictional events following the historic 1908 Tunguska event, at which Soviet scientists discover spores of an extraterrestrial organism, a small harmless thing resembling an armored worm.

However, it turns out the incredibly hardy spores are able to reanimate dead tissue, and subjects turn violent sometime after exposure to the spores; a cartoon then shows the USSR adapting them as a bioweapon and scatters them from balloons in a preemptive strike against the U.S., causing a localized zombie apocalypse before intervening militarily to distribute humanitarian aid. At the end of the cartoon, a hybrid U.S.–USSR flag is raised in the now-Soviet-ruled America, and in 1972, a headless corpse is shown breaching containment and escaping from a Soviet biowarfare lab.

Video origin
Initially, in a video on the website Metclub.com, Kirk Hammett explained the origins of the video. He claimed to have bought the film from a fan for $5 in Russia and soon forgot about it. After digging it up and watching the animated film, he said that he was fascinated by it, researched about its background, and asked a friend's Russian girlfriend to translate parts of it. Following this, Hammett had supposedly been trying to incorporate the film into one of the band's music videos. However, as it was later revealed, Hammett's story was a fake to produce hype about the video: the film was not made in Russia and Hammett did not actually buy it there. Rather, as the video's director Roboshobo stated in an interview, the live action segments (including the ending) were specially shot to look like excerpts of old Russian documentary footage. The video bears similarities to the underground documentary Experiments in the Revival of Organisms, where animal experimentation to produce life extension is depicted. The subtitles and everything else included in the video are part of its concept. The word "Тунгусский" ("Tunguska") appears several times with different typos ("тунгузский", "тунзский", "тчнгзский").

Lyrical meaning
In an interview, James Hetfield commented on the song's lyrical meaning:

Release versions
The single is available in a three-disc collectors set. The first disc was released as a digipack to store the remaining two discs with the album version of "All Nightmare Long", along with the songs "Wherever I May Roam" and "Master of Puppets", recorded live in Berlin at the Death Magnetic release bash at the O2 Arena in September 2008. The second disc also has the studio version of "All Nightmare Long", along with the songs "Blackened" and "Seek & Destroy", also recorded at the Berlin O2 Arena. The third disc is a DVD, which, along with the album version of the song as audio, includes a ten-minute-long mini-documentary about the bands' day in Berlin, along with twenty minutes' worth of live tracks from that night's album release party, as well a fifteen-minute-long movie from the tuning room at the Rock im Park.

In pop culture
The song first appeared as one of the songs off of Death Magnetic that was made available as downloadable content for Guitar Hero III: Legends of Rock. In addition, "All Nightmare Long" can also be imported to several Guitar Hero titles as well as the stand-alone game focused around the band itself, Guitar Hero: Metallica.
"All Nightmare Long" appeared in the documentary McConkey.
WWE used the song as the official theme for the 2008 pay-per-view event No Mercy, and in the video package to promote the Winner Takes All match for the WWE  and Universal Championship at Wrestlemania 38.

Track listing

Personnel
Metallica
 James Hetfield – vocals, rhythm guitar
 Lars Ulrich – drums
 Kirk Hammett – lead guitar
 Robert Trujillo – bass, backing vocals

Production
 Rick Rubin – producing
 Ted Jensen – mastering
 Greg Fidelman – mixing

Charts

References

2008 singles
Metallica songs
Song recordings produced by Rick Rubin
Songs written by James Hetfield
Songs written by Kirk Hammett
Songs written by Lars Ulrich
Songs written by Robert Trujillo
Zombies and revenants in popular culture
2008 songs
Warner Records singles
Songs about nightmares
Cthulhu Mythos music